Sakmarsky District is an administrative and municipal district (raion), one of the thirty-five in Orenburg Oblast, Russia. It is located in the center of the oblast. Its administrative center is the rural locality (a selo) of Sakmara. Population: 29,179 (2010 Census);  The population of Sakmara accounts for 17.2% of the total district's population.

References

Notes

Sources

Districts of Orenburg Oblast